Rees Rutland Jones (1840–1916) was a solicitor and politician in Queensland, Australia. He was a Member of the Queensland Legislative Assembly.

Early life 
Rees Rutland Jones was born in 1840 in Sydney, New South Wales, the son of Rees Jones and Ann (née Thompson). He was the nephew of David Jones, the department store merchant.

Legal practice 
The legal firm Rees R and Sydney Jones was established in 1864 by Rees Rutland Jones and is today the oldest existing legal practice in Queensland. Rees Jones was the solicitor for the Mount Morgan Mining Company and the solicitor for the Rockhampton Town Council from the years 1871 until 1896.

Politics 
Jones was a member of the Rockhampton Municipal Council and the Member for Rockhampton North in the Queensland Legislative Assembly.

Later life 
Jones died on 30 November 1916 in a private hospital in Sydney, New South Wales, following an operation. He had travelled to Sydney to seek medical treatment for an ailment of his throat.

At the time of his death, Jones was the oldest practitioner on the Roll of the Supreme Court of Queensland.

The Rees R & Sydney Jones Building established in 1886 in Rockhampton for his legal firm is now heritage-listed.

References

Attribution

Further reading
 

Members of the Queensland Legislative Assembly
1840 births
1916 deaths
Articles incorporating text from the Queensland Heritage Register